St. Xavier's Girls' College is a national school in Mannar, Sri Lanka.

See also
 List of schools in Northern Province, Sri Lanka
 St. Xavier's Boys' College
 List of Jesuit sites

References

External links
 St. Xavier's Girls' College

Girls' schools in Sri Lanka
National schools in Sri Lanka
Buildings and structures in Mannar, Sri Lanka
Schools in Mannar District